Francesco Grandolfo (born 26 July 1992) is an Italian professional footballer who plays as a forward for  club Arzignano.

Career
A Bari youth system trainee, he made his debut in Serie A on 7 May 2011 in an away fixture against Palermo. In his third appearance of the season, the last day of the season, he scored a hat-trick against Bologna in a match that finished 4–0 to Bari. With this feat, he became the first ever Bari player to score a hat-trick in an away game in Serie A for the club.

Later during the summer, he was loaned out to Chievo on deadline day. After mostly spending the whole season playing with the Primavera under-19 team, Grandolfo made his first team debut on 22 May 2011, in a game against Bologna when he came on as a substitute. He made only one other appearance that season and so finished the season with two appearances and zero goals. As a consequence, Chievo decided not to retain him after his loan expired and so he returned to Bari, who were now in Serie B.

In the first half of the 2012–13 Serie B season, Grandolfo made six appearances for Bari, but form evaded him and he was unable to score in any of those games. Due to lack of minutes at Bari, he went on loan to third division club Tritium where he made thirteen appearances and scored one goal, but once again, this spell proved largely unsuccessful.

He once again returned to Bari at the completion of his loan spell at Tritium but was once again sent out on loan, this time to another third division side, Savona, for the entire 2013–14 season. At Savona his performance did not improve either, as he played only a total fourteen games with a spare goal, and was released for free by Bari at the end of the season.

On 5 September 2014, it was announced Grandolfo had signed a contract with Serie D amateurs Correggese, with whom he had already training during the whole pre-season.

On 12 July 2015, Grandolfo signed a 2-years contract with the Lega Pro side Fidelis Andria.

In August 2016, Grandolfo signed for Serie C club Bassano.

He successively joined newly promoted Serie C club Virtus Verona for the 2018–19 season.

On 10 July 2019 he signed a one-year contract with second-year extension option with Vis Pesaro.

On 9 January 2020 he moved to another Serie C club Sambenedettese.

On 7 September 2020 he joined Legnago.

On 31 July 2021, Grandolfo joined to Monopoli.

On 14 July 2022, he moved to Arzignano.

References

External links
 
 

1992 births
Living people
Sportspeople from the Metropolitan City of Bari
Footballers from Apulia
Italian footballers
Association football forwards
Serie A players
Serie B players
Serie C players
Serie D players
S.S.C. Bari players
A.C. ChievoVerona players
Tritium Calcio 1908 players
Savona F.B.C. players
S.S.D. Correggese Calcio 1948 players
S.S. Fidelis Andria 1928 players
Bassano Virtus 55 S.T. players
Virtus Verona players
Vis Pesaro dal 1898 players
A.S. Sambenedettese players
F.C. Legnago Salus players
S.S. Monopoli 1966 players
F.C. Arzignano Valchiampo players